Up-Front is a 12-inch, 45 rpm EP by the Fleshtones released in 1980. It was the band's first EP and predates their first album, Roman Gods. The EP featured the "Action Combo," brothers Gordon and Brian Spaeth on saxophones. The record sleeve was designed by lead singer Peter Zaremba.

Track listing
All songs by Peter Zaremba, except as indicated.

Side one
"The Girl from Baltimore"
"Cold, Cold Shoes" (Zaremba, Keith Streng)
"Feel the Heat" (Zaremba, Streng)

Side two
"Play with Fire"  (Mick Jagger, Keith Richards, Brian Jones, Bill Wyman, Charlie Watts)
"The Theme from 'The Vindicators'"

Personnel
Keith Streng — guitar & vocals
Peter Zaremba — lead vocals, harmonica & organ
Bill Milhizer — drums & vocals 
Jan Marek Pakulski — bass, vocals 
Gordon Spaeth — alto saxophone
Brian Spaeth — tenor saxophone

1980 debut EPs
The Fleshtones albums
I.R.S. Records EPs